Cloud 9 is a 2008 German drama film directed by Andreas Dresen and starring Ursula Werner, Horst Rehberg, and Horst Westphal. The story focuses on love and sex in old age and had its world premiere at the 2008 Cannes Film Festival, where it won the Heart Throb Jury Prize from the Un Certain Regard jury. The title is an Anglicism of the phrase "cloud nine".

Cast 
 Ursula Werner - Inge
 Horst Rehberg - Werner
  - Karl
 Steffi Kühnert - Petra

Reception

References

External links
 

2008 drama films
2008 films
German drama films
Films directed by Andreas Dresen
Films set in Berlin
2000s German-language films
2000s German films